Kosan County is a kun, or county, in Kangwŏn province, North Korea.

Physical features
The county is largely mountainous. The central area forms a basin.  The county's highest point is Chuaesan.  Major streams include the Namdaech'ŏn, Ryongjiwŏnch'ŏn, and Namsanch'ŏn.  There are a total of 13 reservoirs. Forestland makes up some 63.8% of the county's area.

Administrative divisions
Kosan county is divided into 1 ŭp (town) and 24 ri (villages):

Economy

Agriculture
Agriculture dominates local industry in Kosan, with crops including rice, maize, millet, wheat, barley, soybeans, and red beans. The region is particularly noted for its abundant production of fruit.

Mining
Mining is widely developed, exploiting the local deposits of gold, silver, copper, iron, limestone, lead, zinc, gypsum, and other minerals.

Transport
Kosan county is served by the Kangwŏn Line of the Korean State Railway.

See also
Geography of North Korea
Administrative divisions of North Korea

References

External links

Counties of Kangwon Province (North Korea)